The Mount Vernon Statement is a statement affirming the United States Constitution, particularly in response to the rise of progressivism in the United States. It was inspired by the Sharon Statement.

It was signed on February 17, 2010, at a public library (Collingwood Library and Museum) in Fairfax County, Virginia, a location chosen after the Mount Vernon Ladies' Association, which owns Mt. Vernon, turned down the group's request to hold a meeting at Mr. Washington's estate. 

The statement reads, in part:

We recommit ourselves to the ideas of the American Founding.  Through the Constitution, the Founders created an enduring framework of limited government based on the rule of law. They sought to secure national independence, provide for economic opportunity, establish true religious liberty and maintain a flourishing society of republican self-government.

Original signers
Edwin Meese
Wendy Wright, president of Concerned Women for America
Edwin Feulner
Lee Edwards, who was present at the signing of the Sharon Statement
Tony Perkins
Becky Norton Dunlop, president of the Council for National Policy
Brent Bozell
Alfred S. Regnery, publisher of The American Spectator
David Keene
David M. McIntosh
T. Kenneth Cribb, Jr.
Grover Norquist
Bill Wilson
Elaine Donnelly, president of Center for Military Readiness
Richard Viguerie
Ken Blackwell
Colin Hanna, president of Let Freedom Ring
Kathryn Jean Lopez

References

External links

American political manifestos
2010 in the United States
Conservatism in the United States
2010 in Virginia
2010 documents